The 2010 Ivan Hlinka Memorial Tournament was an under-18 ice hockey tournament held in Břeclav, Czech Republic and Piešťany, Slovakia from August 9–14, 2010.  The two venues were Alcaplast Arena in Břeclav and Patrícia Ice Arena 37 in Piešťany. Canada won the gold for the third consecutive year and the 15th time overall. The United States lost in the final to win the silver, their first medal since 2006. Sweden got the bronze for the third consecutive year by defeating the Czech Republic 6-1 in the bronze medal game.

Preliminary round

Group A

Group B

Final round

Seventh place game

Fifth place game

Semifinal 1

Semifinal 2

Bronze medal game

Gold medal game

Final standings

See also
2010 IIHF World U18 Championships
2010 World Junior Championships

References

External links
2010 Ivan Hlinka Memorial Tournament on Hockey Canada
2010 Ivan Hlinka Memorial Tournament on Onlajny.cz (in Czech)

Ivan Hlinka Memorial Tournament
2009
International ice hockey competitions hosted by Slovakia
International ice hockey competitions hosted by the Czech Republic
Ivan
2010–11 in Slovak ice hockey